Orlando L. Watters (born ) is a former American football cornerback in the National Football League who played for the Seattle Seahawks. He played college football for the Arkansas Razorbacks.

References

1971 births
American football cornerbacks
Arkansas Razorbacks football players
Living people
People from Anniston, Alabama
Seattle Seahawks players